Heinrich Zoelly (1862–1937) was a Mexican-Swiss engineer. He developed steam turbines and turbine-driven locomotives and patented the geothermal heat pump in 1912.

Life and work 
Heinrich Zoelly was the fifth child of Franz Xaver Zoelly. His father, originally from Germany near Klettgau, had emigrated to Mexico to seek better fortune. Heinrich was born in Mexico and received the Mexican citizenship. His father ran a hat factory in Mexico City with his brother John.  When Henry was still a child, his father left Mexico because of political unrest and returned to Europe and settled in Switzerland.  There, Henry attended primary school, skipping two grades before starting at the Federal Polytechnic Institute (which later became ETH Zurich).  He was just 20 years old when he earned his degree in mechanical engineering. After study trips to Mexico and Paris, Heinrich Zoelly went back to Switzerland in 1886. Two years later Zoelly applied in Fluntern for naturalization and became a Swiss citizen.  Heinrich Zoelly was married and had five children.
 
In 1886 Zoelly entered the service of Zurich's Maschinenfabrik Escher Wyss & Cie. He quickly became its technical director at the young age of 26. Thanks to him, the company flourished, which at this time manufactured various steam engines, water turbines, locomotives, traction engines and vessels.

His most significant development was the construction of a multi-stage steam turbine, initially used in water turbines. In 1903 Zoelly developed a multi-stage axial flow impulse turbine in collaboration with Professor Stodola.  Despite low vapor pressure (11 bar) and low temperature (185 °C), this achieved a considerable output of 370 kW and a thermodynamic efficiency of 62%. The original of the first machine of this type is now at the Deutsches Museum. This turbine competed with other steam turbines developed about the same time in the world (Parsons, rake, plate, Curtis, Laval, and others) and was distributed worldwide through licensing.

In 1912 Zoelly was awarded an honorary degree from the ETH Zurich, partly thanks to his work in turbine development.

Since Zoelly was convinced of the superiority of the steam turbine to the steam piston engine, in 1913 Escher Wyss  & Cie. abandoned the production of steam engines and concentrated fully on turbines. Zoelly's vision also extended to steam locomotives (which traditionally used piston engines) using steam turbines as drive. Until his resignation from Escher-Wyss Zoelly devoted himself to the development of a steam turbine-driven locomotive, which he drove forward to serviceability (1926 Zoelly- SLM), and later in 1930 Krupp Zoelly). Since diesel and electric power was increasing, the steam locomotive lost its significance.

Zoelly died in 1937 in his adopted hometown of Zurich.

Further reading 
 Schweizer Pioniere der Wirtschaft und Technik, Band 19: Drei Zürcher Pioniere: Paul Usteri (1853–1927) / Heinrich Zoelly (1862–1937) / Karl Bretscher (1885–1966), Zürich. Verein für wirtschaftshistorische Studien. 1968.

References 

1862 births
1937 deaths
Swiss engineers
ETH Zurich alumni
Mexican engineers
Mexican people of Swiss descent
Mexican emigrants to Switzerland